"O.B.I.T." is an episode of the original The Outer Limits television show. It first aired on 4 November 1963, during the first season.

Introduction
A new device, the O.B.I.T. machine, allows the observation of anyone, anywhere, at any time.

Opening narration

Plot
While inquiring into the murder of an administrator at a government research facility, a U.S. senator is confronted with paranoia, secrecy, and intimidation.  He ultimately learns the cause:  An unusual security device that is used to monitor its employees.  The spying on people leads to: murder, bad morale, false accusations, interrogations, fear, distrust, a breakdown in social activities, a big increase in divorce and alcoholism, suicide, decreased communication and misunderstandings, intimidation, coercion, threats, a breakdown in morality, escapism, or exile, conspiracies, it spreads out of control, it is hideous, it saps the spirit, it's addictive like a drug, it breeds contempt, it causes fights, it drives people apart, it leads to lying, and it was brought in by an enemy of the US.  The Outer Band Individuated Teletracer (known by the acronym O.B.I.T.) is so pervasive and invasive that no one can escape its prying eye, at any time within . It is even deemed addictive by some of its operators. After a missing administrator is found and reveals his knowledge of O.B.I.T., its sinister, unearthly origins and purpose become apparent; the device is, in actuality, an alien invention that was designed to demoralize and desensitize the human race in preparation for invasion. During government hearings, Lomax, one of the project's administrators, reveals himself to be an enemy alien, proudly warning onlookers as to the horrific impact O.B.I.T. will have on mankind. As he speaks, a nearby O.B.I.T. machine shows Lomax in his true alien form. He then proceeds to commit suicide or departs by disintegrating himself or teleporting with an alien weapon or device, leaving the government to deal with the problem of destroying O.B.I.T.

Closing narration

Cast

References

External links
 O.B.I.T. is available for free download at the Internet Archive.
 View O.B.I.T. on Hulu
 "O.B.I.T." appreciation  by Mark Holcomb

The Outer Limits (1963 TV series season 1) episodes
1963 American television episodes
Television episodes about alien invasion
Television episodes set in Washington, D.C.
Works about security and surveillance
Television episodes directed by Gerd Oswald